Men of Honor (released in the UK and Ireland as Men of Honour) is a 2000 American drama film directed by George Tillman Jr. and starring Robert De Niro and Cuba Gooding Jr. The film is inspired by the true story of Master Chief Petty Officer Carl Brashear, the first African American master diver in the United States Navy.

Plot
Carl Brashear leaves his native Kentucky and the life of a sharecropper in 1948 by joining the United States Navy. As a crew member of the salvage ship USS Hoist, where he is assigned to the galley, he is inspired by the bravery of one of the divers, Master Chief Petty Officer Leslie William "Billy" Sunday. He is determined to overcome racism and become the first black American Navy diver, even proclaiming that he will become a master diver. He eventually is selected to attend Diving and Salvage School in Bayonne, New Jersey, where he arrives as a boatswain's mate second class. He finds that Master Chief Sunday is the leading chief petty officer and head instructor, who is under orders from the school's eccentric, bigoted commanding officer to ensure that Brashear fails.

Brashear struggles to overcome his educational shortcomings, a result of his leaving school in the seventh grade, in order to work on his family's failing farm. He receives educational assistance from his future wife, a medical student who works part-time in the New York Public Library in Harlem. Brashear proves himself as a diver by rescuing a fellow student whose dive buddy abandons him during a salvage evaluation. Unfortunately, due to the racism of the commanding officer, the student who fled in the face of danger is awarded a medal for Brashear's heroic actions. Likewise, during an underwater assembling task where each student has to assemble a flange underwater using a bag of tools, Brashear's bag is cut open on purpose. Brashear nevertheless finishes the assembly and graduates from diving school, earning the quiet and suppressed admiration of Sunday and his fellow divers. Sunday is later demoted to senior chief by the commanding officer for standing up for Brashear and allowing him to pass.

The paths and careers of Brashear and Sunday diverge. Brashear rises quickly through the ranks, even becoming a national hero in the 1966 Palomares incident for recovering a missing hydrogen bomb and for saving the lives of Navy crewmen. Sunday continually loses his composure around officers who disrespect his accomplishments, until he is finally demoted to chief petty officer and relegated to menial duties.  He becomes a brooding alcoholic displeased with his lowered rank.

The two eventually meet again after Brashear's left leg was so mangled in the Palomares incident that he feels that his only chance to return to active duty and a relatively normal life is for the leg to be amputated and replaced with a prosthesis. Until this time, no Navy man had ever returned to full active duty with a prosthetic limb.  Sunday again trains Brashear and aids him in his fight against the Navy's bureaucracy and an antagonistic Navy captain (Brashear's and Sunday's former Hoist executive officer) in order to return to full active duty and fulfill his dream of becoming a master diver. They succeed in getting Brashear reinstated.

In the epilogue, it is noted that two years later Brashear becomes a master diver. It is added that he does not retire from the Navy for another nine years.

Cast

 Robert De Niro as Master Chief Leslie 'Billy' Sunday (based on Boatswain's Mate First Class Harry M. Rutherford)
 Cuba Gooding Jr. as Boatswain's Mate Second Class (later Master Diver) Carl Brashear
Chris Warren Jr. as Young Carl
 Charlize Theron as Gwen Sunday
 Aunjanue Ellis as Jo Brashear
 Hal Holbrook as Camp Commanding Officer 'Mr. Pappy' Captain USN.
 Michael Rapaport as Gunners Mate Snowhill, Brashear's barracks mate and a stutterer.
 Powers Boothe as Captain Pullman
 David Keith as Captain Hartigan
 Holt McCallany as Machinist's Mate First Class Dylan Rourke
 David Conrad as Captain Hanks
 Joshua Leonard as Petty Officer Second Class Timothy Douglas Isert
 Carl Lumbly as Mac Brashear, Carl's Father
 Lonette McKee as Ella Brashear, Carl's mother
 Glynn Turman as Chief Floyd
 Joshua Feinman as DuBoyce

Production
The film features the classic US Navy Mark V diving equipment used by the Navy from 1915 until 1985. The equipment was custom made by DESCO, who manufactured the gear for the Navy along with three other makers. The helmets used were actually commercial helmets (which have larger glass windows or "lights") on Navy breast plates, allowing greater visibility of the actors.

Reception
The film opened at the third position at the North American box office behind Little Nicky and Charlie's Angels, which was on its second week at the top spot.

Men of Honor was met with mixed reviews. On Rotten Tomatoes, it currently has an approval rating of 42% based on 106 reviews, with an average rating of 5.3/10. The critics consensus states, "De Niro and Gooding Jr. manage to turn in performances that make this by-the-numbers inspirational movie watchable." According to Metacritic, which compiled 30 reviews and calculated a weighted average score of 56 out of 100, the film received "mixed or average reviews". Audiences polled by CinemaScore gave the film an average grade of "A" on an A+ to F scale. Roger Ebert gave the film three stars out of four, calling it "an old-fashioned biopic" but criticized Theron's appearance in the film, calling it "professional but unnecessary to the picture".

Historical accuracy
While the film portrays a Wisconsin recruit as the only white recruit to remain in Carl Brashear's bunk, the actual individual was a Brazilian diver named Alberto José do Nascimento, who was also dark skinned. Alberto also helped Brashear save a fellow recruit who was trapped underwater during a training exercise.

Soundtrack
Mark Isham's soundtrack was released as an album in 2000.

References

External links

2000 films
2000 drama films
2000s English-language films
20th Century Fox films
American drama films
American films based on actual events
African-American films
Drama films based on actual events
Films about amputees
Films about racism in the United States
Films about the United States Navy
Films directed by George Tillman Jr.
Films featuring underwater diving
Films produced by Robert Teitel
Films scored by Mark Isham
Films shot in Portland, Oregon
Military courtroom films
2000s American films